Touch Me in the Morning is the fourth studio album by American singer Diana Ross, released on June 22, 1973, by Motown Records. It reached number 5 in the USA (number 1 R&B) and sold around 650,000 copies. The arrangements were by Gene Page, Tom Baird, Michael Randall, James Anthony Carmichael, Deke Richards, Gil Askey and Ross.

Reception

The album contained the hit title track, which became Diana Ross' second number 1 single on the US Billboard Hot 100 singles chart, and helped the album peak at number 5 on the US Billboard 200 albums chart.

In the UK the title track and "All of My Life" were both Top Ten singles, and the album reached number 7 and was certified Gold for sales in excess of 100,000 copies.

It includes the first tracks Diana would personally produce on one of her albums, "Imagine" and "Medley: Brown Baby/Save the Children". Several cuts here, including the closing Medley and "My Baby (My Baby, My Own)", were originally intended for the abandoned To The Baby album that Ross also worked on in this period. She would also begin working with her brother/songwriter, Arthur "T-Boy" Ross, during these sessions.

Several of the songs on the album are covers of classics, including John Lennon's "Imagine", Marvin Gaye's "Save the Children" and the Richard Rodgers' standard "Little Girl Blue". The album also includes her recording of "I Won't Last a Day Without You", released a year prior to The Carpenters' hit version, as well as covers of lesser known songs originally recorded by The Fifth Dimension ("Leave A Little Room") and Oscar Brown Jr ("Brown Baby").

Track listing
"Touch Me in the Morning" (Michael Masser, Ron Miller)  – 3:26
"All of My Life" (Michael Randall) – 3:31
"We Need You" (Deke Richards) – 3:44
"Leave a Little Room" (Michael Randall) – 3:37
"I Won't Last a Day Without You" (Roger Nichols, Paul Williams) – 3:49
"Little Girl Blue" (Lorenz Hart, Richard Rodgers) – 3:58
"My Baby (My Baby, My Own)" (Tom Baird) – 2:45
"Imagine" (John Lennon) – 3:01
"Medley: Brown Baby/Save the Children" (Tom Baird/Renaldo Benson, Oscar Brown, Jr., Al Cleveland, Marvin Gaye) – 8:17

2010 Expanded Edition
Touch Me in the Morning: Expanded Edition, released in January 2010, includes a newly remastered version of the original album plus previously unreleased mixes and alternate versions as well as two songs recorded during the same timeline: "Kewpie Doll", written and co-produced by Smokey Robinson, and "When We Grow Up", from Marlo Thomas' 1972 album Free to Be...You and Me.

Disc two of the expanded edition contains the entire previously unreleased To The Baby album, which includes covers of Michael Jackson's "Got To Be There" and Roberta Flack's "The First Time Ever I Saw Your Face", as well as the original title tune, written by Diana's brother Arthur "T-Boy" Ross. It also includes the medley, "Imagine/Save The Children", two songs that were split for the Touch Me In The Morning album, plus alternate original mixes of songs including "Young Mothers", which previously had been issued in 1983.

Track listing
Disc 1 (Touch Me In The Morning) [bonus tracks]

11. "Touch Me in the Morning" (alternate version #1)   
12. "All of My Life" (alternate mix)   
13. "We Need You" (alternate mix)   
14. "Leave a Little Room" (alternate mix)   
15. "Touch Me in the Morning" (alternate version #2)

Disc 2 (To The Baby)
"Part Of You"
"A Wonderful Guest"
"Young Mothers" (alternate version)
"The First Time Ever I Saw Your Face"
"Got To Be There"
"To The Baby"
"Brown Baby" (alternate version)   
"My Baby (My Baby, My Own)" (alternate version)   
"Turn Around" (alternate version)   
"Imagine/Save the Children" (original edit/alternate version)   
"Kewpie Doll" 
"When We Grow Up" (from Free to Be... You and Me)

Charts

Certifications

See also
List of number-one R&B albums of 1973 (U.S.)

External links
 Diana Ross-Touch In The Morning at Discogs

References

1973 albums
Diana Ross albums
Albums arranged by Gene Page
Albums produced by Michael Masser
Albums produced by Gil Askey
Albums produced by Deke Richards
Motown albums